This is a list of minority leaders of the Georgia State Senate:

minority leaders
G